Yeniköy railway station is a railway station in the village of Yeniköy, Balıkesir in Turkey. TCDD Taşımacılık operates two daily intercity trains from İzmir to Bandırma, the 6th of September Express and the 17th of September Express.

References

External links
Yeniköy station timetable

Railway stations in Balıkesir Province
Transport in Balıkesir Province
Balıkesir